"Jal" is the third episode of the first series of the British teen drama Skins. It was written by Bryan Elsley and directed by Adam Smith. It premiered on E4 on 8 February 2007. It is told from the point of view of main character Jal Fazer.

Plot

Jal is preparing for the final of the Young Musician of the Year Competition in London. She is called into the college director's office and told she is to tell the BBC how the college helped her due to her disadvantaged background. Jal feels this is racist to assume she has a disadvantaged background because she is black.

At home, Jal attempts to practice the clarinet for the finals, but is unable on account of her brother's loud grime music. She complains to her father that she needs to practise, but Ronny Fazer, a successful grime singer himself, is uninterested. He tells her that her brothers and their wigger friend, Donny, need to practise also.

As she had plans to go shopping for a dress to wear to the competition with Michelle, Jal goes to Tony's and sits in the living room with Sid and Tony's little sister, Effy while Tony and Michelle have sex. Fed up of waiting for Michelle, Jal takes Sid with her instead. She tells Sid that she knows he loves Michelle, that it is obvious. Jal buys a brown dress for her competition, but seems convinced it is green. Later that night, she argues with Ronny after she hears him rapping alone in his studio. During this, it is revealed that another major reason that he resents Jal is her uncanny likeliness to her mother, who divorced him and left him heartbroken.

That night, Jal and Michelle watch Jal's interview and joke over Jal's angsty lack of co-operation. As the group have plans to go to Ronny's club that night, Michelle helps Jal dress up as Michelle has a keen fashion sense. At the club, all of the boys - including Maxxie - are stunned by Jal's dress which shows off her impressive bust. Sid and Michelle talk at the bar, while Tony flirts with Abigail. Michelle tells Sid she loves him like a brother, but not like a Welsh brother. Depressed by that, Sid goes to the couch to sulk. While Michelle is distracted dancing to one of Ronny's songs, Tony snogs Abigail. Jal witnesses Tony cheating on Michelle, and distraught, sits and broods with Sid. The two agree to go out drinking with a man who had been chatting to Jal. However, he turns out to be an associate of Mad's, and leads them to a narrow alleyway where Mad steals Sid's credit cards and wallet and smashes Jal's expensive clarinet.

Jal's brothers, Ace and Lynton chase after Mad, along with Donny, but Mad gets the better of them and they end up hospitalised. Enraged with what Mad did to his daughter, Ronny and his guys place a hit on Mad. He also buys Jal a new clarinet identical to the one she lost, symbolizing his support for her type of music and a promise to stop resenting her for her resemblance to his ex-wife. The final scene shows Jal at her competition in London.

Main cast
 Larissa Wilson as Jal Fazer
 Mike Bailey as Sid Jenkins
 April Pearson as Michelle Richardson
 Nicholas Hoult as Tony Stonem
 Joe Dempsie as Chris Miles
 Dev Patel as Anwar Kharral
 Hannah Murray as Cassie Ainsworth
 Mitch Hewer as Maxxie Oliver

Arc significance and continuity

Jal's home life
 Jal's father is successful Bristol-based grime MC and artist, Ronny Fazer.
 She has two brothers, Ace and Lynton, who together with their white friend Donny have formed a grime band.
 Jal's father often puts her brothers' needs above hers.
 Jal's mother is not in her life. She left Ronny and neither Jal nor her brothers know why.
 One of the reasons for Jal's father's resentment towards her is her likeness to her mother, who left him heartbroken.

Series relevance
 Mad Twatter finally exacts his revenge on Sid, only to be taken out of the show, either murdered or badly beaten up and frightened by Ronny.
 Tony cheats on Michelle with Abigail.
 Doug makes his first appearance on the show.
 It is confirmed that other members of the group know about Sid's infatuation with Michelle.
 Sid continues to love Michelle despite arranging a date with Cassie.

Soundtrack
 Rhapsody in Blue by George Gershwin
 Clarinet Concerto (Allegro) by Mozart
 Arcane by Arc
 Soul Vibration by J-Walk
 Highest Grade Dub by Roots Manuva
 Breakthrough by Isaac Hayes
 I Get Lifted by George McCrae
 90% of Me is You by Gwen McCrae
 "Original Nuttah" by UK Apachi and Shy FX
 Prince Charming by Adam and the Ants

References

External links 
 Watch "Jal" on 4od
 S1 E3 at e4.com/skins
 Skins on imdb.com

2007 British television episodes
Skins (British TV series) episodes